Karel Raška (17 November 1909 in Strašín – 21 November 1987 in Prague) was a Czech physician and epidemiologist, who headed the successful international effort during the 1960s to eradicate smallpox.

Life

Raška graduated from the gymnasium in Sušice, and later enrolled at the Faculty of Medicine of the Charles University in Prague. He graduated in 1933. In 1948 he received his habilitation, and in 1955 received his professorship.

At the end of World War II, together with epidemiologist František Patočka, he was personally leading measures to stop the spread of epidemic typhus in the Terezín concentration camp. Together they wrote a report describing the appalling conditions and mistreatment of German civilians incarcerated in the Small Fortress after the war ended.

In 1952 he was appointed as the Director of the newly created Institute of Epidemiology and Microbiology in Prague. He studied the hotspots of plague in Soviet Union, India and China. He introduced Rh-factor diagnostics and erythroblastosis foetalis treatment using blood transfusions in Czechoslovakia, which became one of the first countries in Europe to do so.

He was a Director of the WHO Division of Communicable Disease Control since 1963. His new concept of eliminating the disease was adopted by the WHO in 1967 and eventually led to the eradication of smallpox in 1977. Raška was also a strong promoter of the concept of disease surveillance, which was adopted in 1968 and has since become a standard practice in epidemiology.

In 1984 he received the Edward Jenner Medal awarded by the Royal Society of Medicine.

Though respected abroad, Raška's contribution to eradicating smallpox was not appreciated in Communist Czechoslovakia. In 1970 he was fired from the leadership of the Institute of Epidemiology and Microbiology by communist authorities. In 1972 he was forced to retire, and was even banned from entering the Institute premises. The reason was personal enmity from the communist minister of health, . Raška revealed Prokopec plagiarized his doctoral thesis.

Personal life
Raška was married to Helena Rašková, Czech pharmacologist. They had two sons, professor Karel Raška - molecular immunologist and virologist, and professor Ivan Raška - cell biologist.

References

External links
 Academic Bulletin of the Academy of Sciences of the Czech Republic

1909 births
1987 deaths
Czech public health doctors
Czech epidemiologists
Charles University alumni
Academic staff of Charles University
Smallpox eradication
Czechoslovak physicians
People from Klatovy District
Recipients of the Order of Tomáš Garrigue Masaryk, 1st class
World Health Organization officials
Czechoslovak epidemiologists